Following is a list of all Article III United States federal judges appointed by President John F. Kennedy during his presidency. In total Kennedy appointed 126 Article III federal judges, including 2 Justices to the Supreme Court of the United States, 20 judges to the United States Courts of Appeals, 102 judges to the United States district courts, 1 judge to the United States Court of Customs and Patent Appeals and 1 judge to the United States Court of Claims. Two of Kennedy's District Judge appointees, Andrew Augustine Caffrey and Cyrus Nils Tavares, were recess appointed and nominated by President Dwight D. Eisenhower, before being confirmed by the United States Senate and receiving their commissions from President Kennedy.

Additionally, 1 Article I judicial appointment is listed, namely to the United States Tax Court.

United States Supreme Court justices

Courts of appeals

District courts

Specialty courts (Article III)

United States Court of Customs and Patent Appeals

United States Court of Claims

Specialty court (Article I)

United States Tax Court

References
General

 

Specific

Renominations

Sources
 Federal Judicial Center

Judicial appointments
Kennedy

John F. Kennedy-related lists